The UK Singles Chart is the official record chart in the United Kingdom. Until 1983, it was compiled weekly by the British Market Research Bureau (BMRB) on behalf of the British record industry with a two-week break each Christmas. The BMRB used motorcycle couriers to collect the sales figures taken up to the close of trade on Saturday. This data was compiled on Monday and given to the BBC on Tuesday to be announced on BBC Radio 1 at lunchtime and later published in Music Week. On 4 January 1983, the chart was taken over by Gallup who expanded the chart from the Top 75 to the Top 100 and began the introduction of computerised tills which automated the data collection process. The chart was based entirely on sales of physical singles from retail outlets and announced on Tuesday until October 1987, when the Top 40 was revealed each Sunday, due to the new automated process.

During the 1980s there were a total of 191 singles which took the UK chart number 1 spot. In terms of number-one singles, Madonna was the most successful single act of the decade, as six of her singles reached the top spot. George Michael had significant involvement with eight number-one singles; with two number-one singles as a solo artist, four as a member of pop duo Wham!, one as a duet with Aretha Franklin and one as a member of charity supergroup Band Aid. The longest duration of a single at number one was nine weeks, achieved by Frankie Goes to Hollywood's "Two Tribes" in 1984.

The best-selling single of the decade was "Do They Know It's Christmas?" by Band Aid, selling over 3.5 million copies, and passing "Mull of Kintyre" by Wings to become the best-selling single ever. "Do They Know It's Christmas?" is currently the second best-selling song after "Candle in the Wind 1997" by Elton John.

The 1980s saw the introduction of the cassette single (or "cassingle") alongside the 7-inch and 12-inch record formats and in 1987 major record labels developed a common format for the CD single. For the chart week ending 3 May 1989, chart regulations confined Kylie Minogue's song "Hand on Your Heart" to number two. Minogue would have reached number one if sales from cassette singles were included but they were sold for £1.99 – cheaper than was allowed at the time. Following the debacle the British Phonographic Industry reduced the minimum price for cassette singles to become eligible towards sales figures.

Number-one singles

By artist
American entertainer Madonna was the most successful act of the decade in terms of number-one singles. She had six number ones: "Into the Groove" (1985); "Papa Don't Preach", "True Blue" (both 1986); "La Isla Bonita", "Who's That Girl" (both 1987); and "Like a Prayer" (1989). George Michael had significant involvement with seven number-one singles; he was also involved with Band Aid single "Do They Know It's Christmas?" but his contribution was less significant. He had two number-one singles as a solo artist, four as a member of pop duo Wham!, and one as a duet with Aretha Franklin. The following artists achieved three or more number-one hits during the 1980s. 

Additionally, Adam Ant and Boy George each had one solo number one hit and two number one hits as lead singers of bands (Adam and the Ants and Culture Club respectively) totalling three number one hits each.

By record label

The following record labels had five or more number ones on the UK Singles Chart during the 1980s.

Songs with the most weeks at number one 
The following songs spent at least five weeks at number one during the 1980s.

Million-selling and platinum records
The British Phonographic Industry classified singles and albums since 1973 by the number of units sold, with the highest threshold being a "platinum record". Before 1989, a platinum record was given to singles that sold over 1,000,000 units, a gold record for 500,000 unit sales and a silver record for 250,000. For singles released after 1 January 1989, the number of sales required to qualify for platinum, gold and silver records was dropped to 600,000 units (platinum), 400,000 units (gold) and 200,000 units (silver). Fifteen records were classified platinum in the 1980s. These include two songs from the 1970s that were classified platinum in the 1980s: Slade's "Merry Xmas Everybody", released in 1973, re-entered the charts and was classified platinum in 1980 and sold over one million copies by 1985. Pink Floyd's 1979 release "Another Brick in the Wall (Part II)" was classified platinum at the beginning of 1980 and, although certified as selling 0.995 million units, is believed to have surpassed a million copies in the 1980s when sales not "over-the-counter" are included.

In the 1980s, twelve songs were released that were classified platinum in the decade; eleven of these also sold one million units in that time. The double A-side, "Last Christmas""Everything She Wants" by Wham!, is notable for being the only million-selling single of the decade not to reach number one due to Band Aid's "Do They Know It's Christmas?" being released at the same time. In addition, a new version of "Do They Know It's Christmas?" by Band Aid II was released in December 1989 and was classified platinum in 1990 and John Lennon's "Imagine" (originally released in 1975), reached number one in 1981 following  his death and sold over a million copies.

Twelve other songs originally released in the 1980s have since sold one million units, eleven of them following the introduction of music downloads in 2004. The other song released in the 1980s to sell a million copies is "Blue Monday" by New Order which charted in several years during the 80s, but was not listed as a million seller until later.

Additional information 
[No. 2]: The singles "Ghostbusters" and "Fairytale of New York" peaked at number two in the UK singles chart. "Last Christmas" peaked at number two upon its original release, but eventually reached number one in 2021. 

[No. 3]: "Blue Monday" was originally released as a 12" single in 1983, where it peaked at number 9 in the UK Singles Chart. It was re-released in 7" format in 1988 as "Blue Monday 1988" where it reached a higher peak of number 3. It has also been re-released on other occasions, most notably 1995. New Order's label, Factory Records, were not a member of the British Phonographic Industry (BPI) so they never received any sales certifications. However, "Blue Monday" sold more than one million units through combined sales total.

[No. 62]: "Don't Stop Believin'" originally peaked in the UK at number 62 in 1982, but reached number 6 in 2010 following performances on The X Factor.

Notes

References

Further reading
 Davis, Sharon. 80s Chart Toppers: Every Chart-Topper Tells a Story. Edinburgh: Mainstream Publishing, 1999 , 462p.

External links
Archive of all UK Number One Singles of the 1980s with images of original packaging

1980s
Number-one singles
United Kingdom Singles